In graph theory, the lexicographic product or (graph) composition   of graphs  and  is a graph such that

If the edge relations of the two graphs are order relations, then the edge relation of their lexicographic product is the corresponding lexicographic order.

As  showed, the problem of recognizing whether a graph is a lexicographic product is equivalent in complexity to the graph isomorphism problem.

Properties
The lexicographic product is in general noncommutative: . However it satisfies a distributive law with respect to disjoint union: .
In addition it satisfies an identity with respect to complementation: . In particular, the lexicographic product of two self-complementary graphs is self-complementary.

The independence number of a lexicographic product may be easily calculated from that of its factors :
.

The clique number of a lexicographic product is as well multiplicative:
.

The chromatic number of a lexicographic product is equal to the b-fold chromatic number of G, for b equal to the chromatic number of H:
, where .

The lexicographic product of two graphs is a perfect graph if and only if both factors are perfect .

References
.
.

.

External links 

Graph products